Cargo airlines are airlines dedicated to the transport of cargo.

Cargo airlines may also refer to:

 CAL Cargo Air Lines, Israel